Sullivan County is the name of six counties in the United States of America:

 Sullivan County, Indiana
 Sullivan County, Missouri
 Sullivan County, New Hampshire
 Sullivan County, New York
 Sullivan County, Pennsylvania
 Sullivan County, Tennessee